Günbaşı can refer to:

 Günbaşı, Düzce
 Günbaşı, Kazan